The inaugural Atlantic Coast Conference men's basketball tournament was held in Raleigh, North Carolina, at Reynolds Coliseum from March 4–6, 1954.  defeated , 82–80 in overtime, to win the championship. Dickie Hemric of Wake Forest was named tournament MVP.

NC State defeated all three of their in-state rivals on their way to the tournament championship, beating North Carolina in the quarterfinal round, Duke in the semifinal, and Wake Forest in the championship game.

Bracket

References

Tournament
ACC men's basketball tournament
Basketball competitions in Raleigh, North Carolina
College basketball tournaments in North Carolina
ACC men's basketball tournament
20th century in Raleigh, North Carolina